Don Edwards Park is a five field baseball complex located in Newark, Ohio, built in 1963. It hosted a semi-professional league team the Newark Buffalos/Bison in 1994 and in 1995. And is currently home to the Ohio Bison of the Great Lakes Summer Collegiate League.  Don Edwards Park has served as the host site for nine Babe Ruth World Series events.  The Park has hosted a multitude of tournaments over the years.  The facility is currently owned by the City of Newark and operated by the Buckeye Valley Family YMCA.

https://www.facebook.com/DonEdwardsPark/

References

Minor league baseball venues
Sports venues in Ohio
Buildings and structures in Licking County, Ohio
Sports venues completed in 1963
1963 establishments in Ohio